Álvaro Bisama Mayné (born 18 April 1975) is a Chilean writer and literary critic. He was named as one of the best young writers in Latin America by the Hay Festival Bogota (see Bogota39).

He was born in Valparaíso, and studied at the Universidad de Playa Ancha de Ciencias de la Educación and the University of Chile. He teaches at the Universidad Alberto Hurtado.

Bisama has written a number of books including:
Zona cero (Edición del Gobierno Regional de Valparaíso, 2003)
Caja negra (novel, 2006)
Postales urbanas (2006)
Música marciana (novel, Planeta, Santiago, 2008)
Cien libros chilenos (criticism, Ediciones B, Santiago, 2008)
Estrellas muertas (novel, Alfaguara, 2010) (translated into English as Dead Stars by Megan McDowell for Ox and Pigeon Electronic Books, 2014)
Ruido (Alfaguara, 2012)

His awards and citations include:
One of the 100 Young Chilean Leaders, or 100 Líderes Jóvenes Chilenos, selected in 2005 by El Mercurio
Selected by Bogotá 39 in 2007 as one of the best young writers in Latin America
2011 Santiago Municipal Literature Award for Estrellas muertas
Premio Academia 2011 (awarded by Academia Chilena de la Lengua) for the best book of 2010 (Estrellas muertas)
Finalist for the 2013 Altazor Award for Ruido

References

21st-century Chilean novelists
21st-century Chilean male writers
Chilean male novelists
Chilean critics
1975 births
People from Valparaíso
Living people
University of Chile alumni
University of Playa Ancha alumni